Barbara White (11 December 19236 February 2013) was a British actress. She played several leading roles during a brief film career during the 1940s. She also appeared on stage in Lesley Storm's Great Day amongst others. She married the Irish actor Kieron Moore whom she acted with in The Voice Within (1946).

Selected filmography
 It Happened One Sunday (1944)
 The Voice Within (1946)
 Quiet Weekend (1946)
 While the Sun Shines (1947)
 Mine Own Executioner (1947)
 This Was a Woman (1948)

References

Bibliography
 Goble, Alan. The Complete Index to Literary Sources in Film. Walter de Gruyter, 1999.
 Wearing, J.P. The London Stage 1940-1949: A Calendar of Productions, Performers, and Personnel.  Rowman & Littlefield,  2014.

External links

1923 births
2013 deaths
British film actresses
British stage actresses
British television actresses
People from Sheerness